Buzala is a village in northern Georgia. It is located on the left bank of the river Greater Liakhvi, in the Dzau District/Java Municipality, South Ossetia/Shida Kartli region. Distance to the municipal center Java is 1.5 km.

Sources 
 Georgian Soviet Encyclopedia, V. 2, p. 554, Tbilisi, 1977 year.

References 

Mskhlebi Community villages
Populated places in Dzau District